Pedro Alejandro "Ale" García Mejías (born 19 March 2003) is a Spanish footballer who plays for UD Las Palmas. Mainly a right winger, he can also play as a forward.

Club career
Born in Las Palmas, Canary Islands, García joined UD Las Palmas' youth setup in 2019, from Estrella CF. On 4 June 2021, he was called up to make the pre-season with the main squad by manager Pepe Mel.

On 11 September 2021, before even having appeared for the reserves, García made his first team debut by coming on as a late substitute for Jesé in a 1–1 Segunda División home draw against UD Ibiza.

References

External links

2003 births
Living people
Footballers from Las Palmas
Spanish footballers
Association football wingers
Segunda División players
Segunda Federación players
UD Las Palmas players
UD Las Palmas Atlético players
Spain youth international footballers